Greenbank is a rural residential suburb in the City of Logan, Queensland, Australia.

Geography

Once divided between the Shire of Beaudesert and Logan City, the Queensland Government's amalgamation of local government resulted in Greenbank becoming entirely within Logan City, since 15 March 2008.

The suburb is surrounded by farmland and includes the forested Greenbank Military Range, which is on the Commonwealth Heritage List. A strip of parkland and a watercourse originally named The Platypus Pools and Bracken Way is a natural habitat for a number of species of flora and fauna including platypus, the rare black cockatoo, kookaburra, the blue wren, kingfisher, honeyeaters, owls, kangaroos, wallabies, koalas, possums, bearded dragons, legless lizards and water monitors up to 2.5 metres in length. Many more species have been sighted living in this natural habitat. The watercourse and natural forest are fed by torrential rains and natural springs dotted throughout the Spring Mountain area, continuing through to Greenbank, Browns Plains and finishing at Karrawatha National Park. Snakes, mostly consisting of python, whip snakes and red-bellied black snakes, and to a much lesser degree brown snakes. Bird-eating spiders, huntsman spiders, redback spiders and the orb-weaver spider also share the watercourse and forest area.

The parkland stretches along on either side of the watercourse and a variety of walking tracks of different fitness levels are used by residents for casual strolls, nature lovers and athletic enthusiasts, horse and bike riding. The tracks extend out into estates of Greenbank; such as Blue Grass, New Beith, Lyons and Teviot Downs Estates which cover more forested areas, while Spring Mountain Estate contains the natural forest areas and watercourse. The walking track connects with neighbouring Boronia Heights.

History
Greenbank is situated in the Yugarabul traditional Aboriginal country of the Brisbane and surrounding regions. Towards the south of Greenbank is the Bundjalung traditional Aboriginal country.

The early name of the district was Teviot but derives its present name Greenbank from the name of a cattle property belonging to William Slack.

Greenbank was first settled by Europeans in the 1840s. In the 1880s the main industries were dairying, farming and timber cutting. Cobb & Co had a changing station for their coaches at a hotel on the corner of Teviot Road and Pub Lane; from there, they would travel to Beaudesert via the Old Paradise Road between Acacia Ridge and Jimboomba. When the coach service ceased in 1924, the hotel licence lapsed.

Greenbank Provisional School was built by volunteer labour and opened on 23 January 1893 with 12 pupils under teacher Mary Mulroney who received an annual salary of £50. It became Greenbank State School on 1 January 1909. It closed between 1943 and 1950 due to low student numbers.

The population of Greenbank in 1996 was 5,098 people and 84% of the homes in Greenbank were owner-occupied.  By 2001, the population was 5,261 showing a population growth of 3% in the area during that time. 86% of the homes in Greenbank were owner-occupied.

The median age of the Greenbank population was 36 years, 1 year below the national median of 37. 75.1% of people living in Greenbank were born in Australia. The other top responses for country of birth were England 5.8%, New Zealand 5.5%, Vietnam 0.9%, Taiwan 0.7%, South Africa 0.6%. 87.6% of people spoke only English at home; the next most common languages were 1.5% Vietnamese, 1.1% Mandarin, 0.6% Hmong, 0.5% Mon-Khmer, 0.5% Spanish.

In May 2014, the median sale price of houses in the area in Australian dollars was $395,000. 

As of June 2017, the median sale price of houses had risen to $560,000.

Everleigh State School opened in January 2022.

Education

Greenbank State School is a government primary (Prep-6) school for boys and girls at 12-54 Goodna Road. In 2013, the school had an enrolment of 1,117 students with 72 teachers (63 full-time equivalent). In 2018, the school had an enrolment of 1,048 students with 76 teachers (66 full-time equivalent) and 37 non-teaching staff (25 full-time equivalent). It includes a special education program.

Everleigh State School is a government primary (Prep-6) school for boys and girls at 46-76 Ivory Parkway. It opened in January 2022.

There are no secondary schools in Greenbank. The nearest secondary schools are Park Ridge State High School in neighbouring Park Ridge to the east and Springfield Central State High School in Springfield Central to the west.

Amenities
The Greenbank Community Centre and Library, operated since March 2008 by the Logan City Council, is located at 145-167 Teviot Road.

There are a number of parks in the area, including:

 Andrew Josey Gully
 Argyle Road Park
 Bradley Court Park
 Butterfly Park
 Greenbank Meadows Park
 Greenwood Lakes
 Habitat Springs
 Lance Road Park
 Lyndale Road Park
 Oxley Creek
 Oxley Creek Park
 Pub Lane Park
 Roberts Road Park
 Thompson Road Park
 Tully Connection Road Par
 White Rock- Spring Mountain Conservation Estate
 Woodfall Road Park

Sports

The Greenbank Recreation Reserve is home to the Greenbank Sports & Recreation Club and the Greenbank Raiders Rugby League Club. Situated on Middle Rd the rugby club caters for teams from under 6 to under 18 in 2009.  Three teams won premierships in 2009. Under 15 division 4, Under 18 division 1 and the very successful under 16 division 2 which completed the year undefeated.  They were minor premiers and won the grand final.

Greenbank is also home to the successful Greenbank Football Club. In 2011, the team made history by winning three senior Premierships and two Championships in three divisions. Greenbank FC is affiliated with Football Brisbane and provides an avenue for both junior and senior players. In 2011, Greenbank FC fielded teams from squirts up to under 14 age groups and both men and women teams. 2016 was Greenbank FC's 40th anniversary.

References

Further reading

External links

 University of Queensland: Queensland Places: Greenbank
  — a description of Greenbank in 1930

Suburbs of Logan City